YM-976 is a phosphodiesterase inhibitor.

References

Phosphodiesterase inhibitors